= Tuition =

Tuition may refer to:

- Formal education, education within a structured institutional framework
- Tutoring, private academic help
- Tuition payments, fees charged for education.
